Cameron Winnett (born 7 January 2003) is a Welsh rugby union player, currently playing for United Rugby Championship side Cardiff. His preferred position is fullback.

Cardiff
Winnett was called into Cardiff's European squad ahead of their European campaign. He made his debut for Cardiff in the second round of the 2021–22 European Rugby Champions Cup against , starting at fullback and scoring a try.

References

External links
itsrugby.co.uk Profile

2003 births
Living people
Welsh rugby union players
Cardiff Rugby players
Rugby union fullbacks